Marketplace is a Southwest Transitway station in the Barrhaven neighbourhood of Ottawa, Ontario, Canada. The station is located at the Chapman Mills Marketplace shopping centre, an extensive commercial zone which contains big-box stores and department stores.

A temporary bus terminal served the neighbourhood initially. This street facility was replaced on 17 April 2011 by the permanent Transitway station and a new southerly terminus at Barrhaven Centre station which became the main connection point for local bus routes.

Route 177 travels north via the Transitway towards Fallowfield Station during AM peak, and provides residents in Cambrian with improved connections. These trips do not serve Longfields Drive between Jockvale Road and Marketplace Avenue, or Marketplace Avenue between Longfields Drive and the Transitway, and instead travel via Jockvale Road northbound directly to Barrhaven Centre station.

Starting 19 July 2014, route 99 has selected trips extended to/from Barrhaven Centre Station via Nepean Woods Station, Beatrice Station, and the Vimy Memorial Bridge, providing a connection to Riverside South and Greenboro Station. This extension was later applied to all trips of route 99, and starting 5 September 2021, select routes have been extended even further to CitiGate.

Service

The following routes serve Marketplace station as of September 2 2021:

Public art
Artist Cheryl Pagurek was chosen as the winner of a competition  to provide public art in Marketplace Corridor.
Her artwork, titled, Currents, features video imagery of the Jock River on a large screen. The images in the video present a link between a nearby body of water in an area of urban development.

The images used in Currents are sourced from various collections, including the City of Ottawa Archives, the Canada Science and Technology Museum, the Goulbourn Museum, the Nepean Museum, and private collections. Currents can also be viewed through a mobile device as you commute.

References

External links
Southwest Transit 2011 Version 4 Map

2011 establishments in Ontario
Transitway (Ottawa) stations